Hållbus Totte Mattson (usually known simply as Totte Mattson) is a multi-instrumentalist folk musician from Dalarna, Sweden.  Mattson's instruments include the lute, baroque lute, mandora, bass mandora, hummel, classical guitar, baroque guitar Mora-oud, accordion, Swedish dulcimer, hurdy-gurdy and vocals.

Mattson was a founding member in 1980 of the seminal Swedish folk ensemble Groupa along with Mats Edén. In 1987, Mattson, Anders Stake (now Anders Norudde) and percussionist Björn Tollin formed the band Hedningarna in order to explore the possibilities of developing a new musical style based on elements of traditional music. The group wrote and played a major part of the music to theatre project Den stora vreden (rough translation: The Great Wrath) at Gävleborgs folkteater (the county theatre of Gävleborg), first time performed in 1988, that attracted much attention. A fairly large portion of the music on their first record was originally performed in that play.

Mattson has also participated in the Swedish musical and dance ensemble Boot with Ola Bäckström (viola d'amore, bouzouki) and Björn Tollin (percussion).

In 1999, Mattson and Stefan Brisland-Ferner of Garmarna began collaborating on a musical project that would involve a novel use of hurdy-gurdies, which would expand on the idea that the hurdy-gurdy was the medieval equivalent of a synthesizer.  In 2005, they released their first album under the name Hurdy-Gurdy, titled Prototyp. The album consists of twelve traditional and original songs, played entirely on two Swedish hurdy-gurdies by Brisland-Ferner and Mattson.  Specialized recording and computer editing techniques were used to produce a number of unique musical effects.

Groups 
Groupa
Hedningarna
Boot

Discography 
Av Bara Farten (with Groupa), 1982
Vildhonung (with Groupa), 1985
Utan Sans (with Groupa), 1989
Hedningarna (with Hedningarna), 1989
Månskratt (with Groupa and Lena Willemark), 1990
Kaksi (with Hedningarna), 1991
Trä (with Hedningarna), 1994
Kruspolska: SASHA mixes, 1994
Hippjokk (with Hedningarna), 1997
Karelia Visa (with Hedningarna), 1999
Virvla (with Boot), 1999
1989-2003 (with Hedningarna), 2003
Prototyp (Hurdy-Gurdy, with Stefan Brisland-Ferner), 2005
Soot (with Boot), 2010

References 

Swedish male musicians
Swedish folk musicians
Living people
Swedish lutenists
Year of birth missing (living people)